Bourke Blakemore Hickenlooper (July 21, 1896 – September 4, 1971), was an American politician and member of the Republican Party, first elected to statewide office in Iowa as lieutenant governor, serving from 1939 to 1943 and then as the 29th Governor of Iowa from 1943 to 1945. Hickenlooper was first elected to the United States Senate in 1944.  He served in the Senate from 1945 to 1969.

Born in 1896 in Blockton, Iowa, Hickenlooper's college education at Iowa State College in Ames was interrupted by his service in the U.S. Army. He served as an officer in France during World War I. After his military service Hickenlooper continued his education at Iowa State and then went on to the University of Iowa College of Law, where he received a law degree in 1922. He practiced law in Cedar Rapids, Iowa. Hickenlooper was a Methodist.

In the Senate, Hickenlooper was known as part of the most conservative and isolationistic members of the Republican Party, and as possibly one of the most conservative American congressmen. He became one of the most powerful Republicans in the Senate, serving as the Republican Policy Committee Chairman from 1962 to 1969. In this position, he had an intense rivalry with Everett Dirksen, the Senate Republican leader at the time. Hickenlooper voted in favor of the Civil Rights Acts of 1957 and 1960, but much like fellow conservative Barry Goldwater, voted against the Civil Rights Act of 1964 due to government overreach. He also voted in favor of the 24th Amendment to the U.S. Constitution and the Voting Rights Act of 1965.

Hickenlooper died in 1971 in Shelter Island, New York and is buried at the Cedar Memorial Park cemetery in Cedar Rapids, Iowa.

Legislation
The 1962 Hickenlooper Amendment to the foreign aid bill cuts off aid to any country expropriating U.S. property. The amendment was aimed at Castro's Cuba, which had expropriated U.S.-owned and U.S.-controlled sugar plantations and refineries.

External links

 Congressional Biography
 Biographical notes and descriptions of archive of Hickenlooper's congressional papers and notes 

|-

|-

|-

|-

|-

|-

1896 births
1971 deaths
Republican Party governors of Iowa
Iowa State University alumni
Old Right (United States)
Lieutenant Governors of Iowa
University of Iowa College of Law alumni
Iowa lawyers
Republican Party United States senators from Iowa